Lyuh Woon-hyung or Yo Un-hyung (May 25, 1886 – July 19, 1947) was a Korean politician who argued that Korean independence was essential to world peace, and a reunification activist who struggled for the independent reunification of Korea following its national division in 1945.

His pen-name was Mongyang (몽양; 夢陽), the Hanja for "dream" and "the sun." He is rare among politicians in modern Korean history in that he is revered in both South and North Korea.

Life

Lyuh was born in Yangpyeong, Gyeonggi Province, the son of a local yangban magnate. At age 15, Lyuh enrolled in the Baejae School but in less than one year moved to Heunghwa School. After moving to yet another school and leaving that school before graduation, Lyuh began in 1907 to study the Bible and befriended the American missionary Charles Allen Clark, who helped him found Kidok Kwangdong School in 1909. In 1910, Lyuh dramatically parted from Korean tradition by freeing slaves owned by his household. In 1911, Lyuh enrolled in Pyongyang Presbyterian Theological Seminary and, in 1914, went to China where he studied English literature at a university in Nanjing. In 1917, he moved to Shanghai. In 1918, he organized the Mindan (Korea Resident Association) in that city, to provide a base for pro-independence activities. Lyuh took part in the establishment of the Provisional Government of the Republic of Korea in 1919 and served as a member of that body's Legislative Assembly (Imsi Uijeongwon).
 
Like many in the Korean independence movement, Lyuh sought aid from both right and left. In 1920, he joined the Koryǒ Communist Party (고려 공산당, Goryeo Gongsandang) and, in 1921, attended the First Congress of the Toilers of the Far East in Moscow. When Lyuh Woon Hyung was in Moscow, He met Leon Trotsky and Vladimir Lenin. In 1924 he joined Sun Yat-sen's Chinese Nationalist Party and worked for Sino-Korean cooperation. After being released from prison in 1932, Lyuh took on a variety of independence activities in areas of the media and sports. During the Berlin Olympics a Korean marathon runner, Sohn Kee-chung, won the gold medal. The Chungang Daily News, of which Lyuh was the editor, ran the photograph but removed the Japanese flag from his jersey. The Japanese closed down the newspaper and arrested Lyuh for the action. In addition to serving as editor of the Chungang Daily News, he also served as the president of the Choson JungAng Ilbo (조선중앙일보) and other sports associations.

In anticipation of Japan's defeat in the Second World War, Lyuh organized in 1944 the Korean Restoration Brotherhood (조선건국동맹, Joseon Geon-guk Dongmaeng), a nationwide underground organization. He also formed the Committee for Preparation of Korean Independence (조선 건국 준비 위원회, Joseon Geon-guk Junbi Wiwonhoe), succeeded by the Korean Restoration Brotherhood. In September 1945, Lyuh proclaimed the establishment of the People's Republic of Korea and became its vice-premier. When the United States landed on the Korean Peninsula, General Hodge did not recognize the government of the People's Republic of Korea that Lyuh Woon Hyung established. In October, he stepped down under pressure from the United States Military Government, and organized the People's Party of Korea, becoming its chairman. For the following months of the anti-trusteeship movement and other political changes, Lyuh took a line of action in concert with the communists.

When a movement to unify the political left and the political right arose in May 1946, Lyuh represented the center-left. However, Lyuh's political stance was attacked by both the extreme right and the extreme left, and his efforts to pursue a centrist position was made increasingly untenable by the political realities of the time. On July 19, 1947, Lyuh was assassinated in Seoul by a 19-year-old man named Han Chigeun, a recent refugee from North Korea and an active member of a nationalist right-wing group. Lyuh's death was widely mourned.

Timeline

 1886 May 25 – Born in Yangpyeong Yangseo-myeun Shingok-ri (now Shinwon-ri) Myogok (妙谷), Gyeonggi Province
 1894 – In period of Donghak Peasant Revolution, his family fled to Danyang, Chungcheongbuk-do and after 2 years, returned to Myogok.
 1900 – Enrolled in the Baejae School
 1901 – Transferred to Heung-hwa School (흥화학교).
 1902 – Entered school attached to the Correspondent bureau (우무학당).
 1903 – Spouse died in August. Grandfather died in October.
 1905 – Mother died.
 1906 – Father died.
 1907 – Became Christian. Founded Gwang-dong school (광동학교) in Yangpyeong.
 1908 – Founded branch of National Debt Repayment Movement in Yangpyeong and toured to speech about it.
 1910 – Became a teacher of Chodang Uisuk (초당의숙) of Gangneung.
 1911 – Had been fired from school because of rejecting Japanese era name. Entered to Pyeongyang seminarium and studied to 2 years
 1914 – Entered the English literature course of Jinling University (金陵大学) in Nanjing, studied 3 years.
 1917 – Got a job of travel Agent at Xiehe bookstore (協和書局) in Shanghai and helped Koreans in passage procedure. Met Sun Yat-sen. In summer, returned to Korea in private. Fled to China with Lee Beom-seok.
 1918 – Founded New Korea Youth Party in Shanghai and had been appointed to the leader.
 1919 – Became deputy of Ministry of Foreign Affairs of the Provisional Government of the Republic of Korea in Shanghai.
 1919 November 27 – Visited Japan and had a speech at the Imperial Hotel about Right to life of Koreans.
 1920 – Joined the Koryǒ Communist Party in Shanghai and became a translation committee member and propaganda agent.
 1921 – Established "Korea-China Cooperated company" (Hanjung hojosa, 韓中互助社, 한중호조사) in Shanghai.
 1922 January – Participated in "Conference for Oppressed people of the Far east" (遠東被壓迫民族大會, 원동피압박민족대회) in Moscow. Met Vladimir Lenin and discussed about anti-imperialism movement in Korea. in October, Organized "Hanguk Nobyunghoe" (韓國勞兵會, 한국노병회) with Kim gu, Son jung-do etc.
 1924 – Became a special member of the Communist Party of China
 1929 July – Became coach of the soccer team of Fudan University and went to the Southeast Asia for educational travel with players. While in travel he made a speech of Anti-Imperialism at the Philippines, Singapore etc. Arrested by Japanese police in Shanghai and taken to Korea. Had been sentenced to imprisonment for 3 years.
 1932 November – Had been released on parole from the prison of Daejeon.
 1933 February – Became the president of the Chungang Daily News (Chosun JungAng Ilbo, 조선중앙일보).
 1934 – Became chairman of the "Korea Sports Council" (조선체육회).
 1935 – Set up the gravestone in Yi Sun-sin graveyard of Asan.
 1936 August – Chungang Daily News ceased publication eternally for removing Japanese flag of Sohn Kee-chung's picture.
 1940 – Gone off to Tokyo and led and inspire Korean students in Japan. Met Fumimaro Konoe, Shūmei Ōkawa.
 1942 December – Arrested by Military police for violation of "Peace Preservation Law" (治安維持法)
 1943 – Got released from prison with three years of probation. while retired from active life, he made contact with comrade and led the young people.
 1944 August 10 – Formed Korean Restoration Brotherhood Secretly in Sam-gwang Oriental Medical Clinic (삼광한의원) in Seoul and expanded it on a nationwide scale. Rejected the suggestion to go to China of Endo Ryusaku (遠藤柳作), the vice-minister of the post of Governor-General of Korea (朝鮮総督府政務総監). Formed the "Farmers' Brotherhood"(농민동맹) at the Yongmun Mountain in Yangpyeong.
 1945 August 15 – Met Endo and had been transferred authority of administration and public order from Endo.
 1945 August 17 – Formed the Committee for Preparation of Korean Independence.

 1945 September 6 – Had been elected to temporary chairman of "National People's Representative Conference"(전국인민대표자회의 →People's Republic of Korea).
 1945 November 12 –  Formed "People's Party of Korea" (조선 인민당).
 1946 February 9 ~ February 11 – Visited Haeju, Pyongyang and met Cho Man-sik, Kim Il-sung.
 1946 February 15 – Be elected one of the co-chairmen of "National Front for Democracy" (民主主義民族戰線, 민주주의민족전선).
 1946 May – Propelled "Left-right cooperation movement" (좌우합작운동) with Kim Kyu-sik, An Jae-hong etc.
 1946 July 17 – had been kidnapped to a mountain of Seoul Sindang-dong and escaped risk of murdered.
 1946 October 16 – Founded "Socialist Labourer's Party" (사회로동당).
 1946 December 28 ~ 1947 January 8 – Visited Pyongyang.
 1947 May 24 – Founded "Labor People's Party" (근로인민당). Had been elected to chairman.
 1947 July 19 – Had been Assassinated by Han Ji-geun, a member of secret society for White Terror "Baek-ui-sa" (백의사), at the Hyehwa-dong Rotary road, Seoul.

Belief

 혈농어수 – 피는 물보다 짙다 (血濃於水): Blood is thicker than water

Genealogy

 Grandfather : Lyuh Gyu-sin (여규신, 呂圭信, ? ~ 1903 October)
 Grandmother : ?
 Father : Lyuh Jeong-hyeon (여정현, 呂鼎鉉, ? ~ 1906)
 Mother : Lee of Gyeongju (경주 이씨, 慶州李氏, ? ~ 1905 September)
 Spouse : Rhew, Se-yeong's daughter (류세영의 장녀, 진주柳氏, ? ~ 1903 October, Married 1899–1903)
 Younger brother's grandson, Ki-Won Rhew (President, Willows Memorial Foundation of Korea’s First Aviation School & Air Corps, 윌로우스 대한민국 임시정부 한인비행학교/비행대 기념재단 (윌로우스 항공 기념재단))
 Spouse : Jin Sang-ha (진상하, 陳相夏, 1885 ~ ?)
 Daughter : Lyuh Nan-gu (여난구, 呂鸞九, 1923 ~ ?), Dropped out Ewha Womans University due to heart disease
 Daughter : Lyuh Yeon-gu (여연구, 呂鷰九, 1927 ~ 1996 September 28)
 Daughter : Lyuh Won-gu (여원구, 呂鴛九, 1928 ~ 2009 July 30)
 Daughter : Lyuh Hyeong-gu (여형구, 呂鶑九)
 Son : Lyuh Bong-gu (여봉구, 呂鳳九, 1914 ~ 1932 November 14), Died of typhoid fever
 Son : Lyuh Hong-gu (여홍구, 呂鴻九, 1918 ~ 1939), Died of tetanus
 Son : Lyuh Young-gu (여영구, 呂鸋九, 1930~?)
 Japanese woman
 Son : Lyuh Boong-gu (여붕구, 呂鵬九, 1936 ~ 1991), Died of Heart attack
 Jin Ok-chul (진옥출, 陳玉出)
 Daughter : Lyuh Sun-gu(여순구, 呂鶉九, 1942 ~ )
 Brother : Lyuh Woon-il (여운일, 呂運一, 1890 ~ ?)
 Brother : Lyuh Woon-hong (여운홍, 呂運弘, 1891 September 1 ~ 1973 February 3)
 Sister : Lyuh

Actors depicting Lyuh
 Portrayed by Kim Gil-ho in the 1981 MBC TV series The First Republic.
 Portrayed by Kim Yun-hyung in the 2003 SBS TV series Age of Wanderer.
 Portrayed by Shin Goo in the 2006 KBS1 TV series Seoul 1945.

See also

 History of South Korea
 Korean independence movements
 Provisional Government of the Republic of Korea
 People's Party of Korea
 Workers Party of South Korea
 Seoul 1945
 Kim Kyu-sik
 An Chang-ho
 Syngman Rhee
 Kim Gu
 Song Jin-woo (journalist)
 Cho Man-sik
 Kim Seong-su (journalist)
 Kim Won-bong
 Pak Hon-yong

Notes

References

Source: Paekbom Ilchi, English version, historical notes.

 여운형
 ‘세계사적 개인’이었던 민주주의자 여운형 ①
 ‘세계사적 개인’이었던 민주주의자 여운형 ③
 <KBS Documentary> Yuh Woon-Hyung
 Kang Man-gil, 《항일독립투쟁과 좌우합작》 (한울, 2000)
 Kang Jun-man, 《한국현대사산책》〈1940년대편 1권〉(인물과사상사, 2004)
 Kang Jun-man, 《한국현대사산책》〈1940년대편 2권〉(인물과사상사, 2004) p47.
 Kang Jun-sik, 《적과 동지》(한길사, 1993)
 Kang Jun-sik, 《혈농어수 : 몽양 여운형 일대기》(아름다운 책, 2006)
 Kang Jun-sik, 《조선독립의 당위성 (외) : 여운형 편》(종합출판 범우, 2008)
 Mongyang Memorial Society & Mongyang Institute,《Yuh Woon-hyng Note(여운형 노트)》(학민사, 1994)
 Pak Tae-gyun, 《The Korean War(한국전쟁)》(책과함께, 2005) p47.
 Yuh Yeon-gu / edited by Shin Jun-yeong, 《My father Yuh Woon-hyung(나의 아버지 여운형)》(김영사, 2001)
 Yuh Woon-hong,《몽양 여운형》(청하각, 1967)
 Lee Gi-hyung,《몽양 여운형》 (실천문학사, 1984)
 Lee Gi-hyung,《여운형 평전》(실천문학, 2000)
 Lee Man-gyu, 《여운형투쟁사》 (민주문화사, 1946)
 Lee Chong Sik,《Lyuh Woon Hyung: the Korean harmonist(여운형: 시대와 사상을 초월한 융화주의자)》(Seoul National University Press, 2008)
 Lee Chong Sik, Choi Sang-yong etc., 《여운형을 말한다》(아름다운책, 2007)
 Lee Chul-seung·Pak Gab-dong,《건국50년 대한민국 이렇게 세웠다》(계명사, 1998)
 Jung Byung-joon, 《몽양 여운형 평전》(한울, 1995)
 Jung Hui-joon, 《스포츠 코리아 판타지: 스포츠로 읽는 한국 사회문화사》- 조선 스포츠의 아버지, 여운형 (개마고원, 2009)
 《여성동아》(2002.9.18.) "여원구 북한 최고인민회의 부의장"
 《정계야화》 (전2권) (홍우출판사, 1966)
 Jung Yong-uk, 《존 하지와 미군 점령통치 3년》 (중심, 2003)
 Han Yun-hyung, 《뉴라이트 사용후기: 상식인을 위한 역사전쟁 관전기)》 (개마고원, 2009)

External links 

 Who was Yo Un-Hyung?
 Who was Yo Un-hyung? (Part II)
 Mongyang Memorial Society 
 Ministry of Patriots and Veterans Affairs, 독립유공자 공훈록 – Yeo Woon-hyung 
 <신간> '여운형을 말한다' 

1886 births
1947 deaths
Assassinated Korean politicians
Korean expatriates in China
Korean nationalists
Korean socialists
Korean independence activists
Korean revolutionaries
People from Yangpyeong County
People murdered in Korea
South Korean social democrats
South Korean progressives
Assassinated South Korean politicians
Kim Won-bong
Korean Christians
Hamyang Yeo clan